Odites monogona is a moth in the family Depressariidae. It was described by Edward Meyrick in 1938. It is found in the Democratic Republic of the Congo (Orientale, North Kivu).

References

Moths described in 1938
Odites
Taxa named by Edward Meyrick